Protection policy may refer to:
 
Policies
 Information protection policy
 Data protection policy
 Planetary protection policy
 Whistleblower protection policy
 Environmental protection policy
 Farmland protection policy
 Child protection policy
 Cultural heritage protection policy

Finance
 Income protection policy
 Payment protection policy
 Tax protection policy
 Protectionism, a trade protection policy

Technology
 Executable space protection policy